Chulkovo is a rural locality (a settlement) in Denisovskoye Rural Settlement, Gorokhovetsky District, Vladimir Oblast, Russia. The population was 745 as of 2010. There are 18 streets.

Geography 
Chulkovo is located 20 km southwest of Gorokhovets (the district's administrative centre) by road. Bolshaya Karpovka is the nearest rural locality.

References 

Rural localities in Gorokhovetsky District